Gerald Albert Sithole (born 28 December 2002) is an English professional footballer who plays as a winger or striker for EFL League One side Bolton Wanderers.

Career
Having come through Gillingham's youth set-up, he signed his first professional contract with the club on 17 April 2021, hours before being named on the first-team bench for their match against Oxford United. He made his league debut for the club on 24 April 2021 as an 88th-minute substitute in a 2–2 draw with Northampton Town. He made his first appearance of the 2021–22 season on 7 August 2021 in a 1–1 draw with Lincoln City, before scoring the first goal of his career three days later with the opening goal of a 2–2 draw with Crawley Town in the EFL Cup. Following the club's relegation to League Two, Sithole was released by the club at the end of the 2021–22 season.

On 24 June 2022 it was announced that he had signed for League One side Bolton Wanderers, and would feature initially for its B team.

Style of play
Sithole can play as a winger or as a striker.

Career statistics

References

External links

Living people
2002 births
English footballers
Association football wingers
Association football forwards
Gillingham F.C. players
Bolton Wanderers F.C. players 
English Football League players